OFC Karnobat is a Bulgarian association football club based in Karnobat, currently playing in the South-East Third League, the third level of Bulgarian football.

Current squad

References

External links 
 Official page at Facebook
 Club profile at bgclubs.eu

Karnobat